R. Kelly is the eponymously-titled second studio album by American R&B singer-songwriter R. Kelly. It was released on November 14, 1995, by Jive Records. The production was handled entirely by Kelly himself. It spawned three number one R&B singles: "You Remind Me of Something", "Down Low (Nobody Has to Know)" and "I Can't Sleep Baby (If I)".

Critical reception

R. Kelly received mostly positive reviews from music critics. Callum Jones of Rolling Stone wrote, Kelly "has grown out of his unthinking misogyny to the point where he makes a plea in 'As I Look Into My Life' to 'brothers in the ghetto' to 'love and respect that woman and bring her happiness.' Make love not war is an old message, but Kelly delivers it with sincerity. By spreading it in the hood in these violent times, he believes he's doing God's work, and who's to say he is wrong? Predecessors like Marvin Gaye and Prince have shown that great sex is spiritual, and Kelly's make-out music ranks with the best."

Commercial performance
The album debuted at number one on the Billboard 200; it is R. Kelly's first album in his career to chart at number one on the Billboard 200.

Accolades
In August 1996 at the MTV Video Music Awards, "Down Low (Nobody Has to Know)" was nominated for Best Male Video.

Track listing
All songs written, produced, and arranged by R. Kelly

Personnel
Credits adapted from AllMusic.

Ray Bady – Vocals (Background)
Chris Brickley – Engineer
Lafayette Carthon – Keyboards
Kirk Franklin – Choir Director, Guest Artist
Stephen George – Engineer, Mixing, Programming
Bernie Grundman – Mastering
Barry Hankerson – Executive Producer
Charlotte Horton – Vocals (Background)
Ernie Isley – Guest Artist, Guitar, performer, Primary Artist
Ronald Isley – Guest Artist, performer, Primary Artist, Vocals (Background)
R. Kelly – Composer, Keyboards, Mixing, Multi Instruments, Primary Artist, producer, Vocals, Vocals (Background)
Mr. Lee – Guest Artist, Mixing, Multi Instruments, Programming
Peter Mokran – Engineer, Keyboards, Mixing, Programming
The Notorious B.I.G. – Guest Artist, Primary Artist, Rap, Unknown Contributor Role
Jim Slattery – Multi Instruments
Marinna Teal (Strings) – Vocals (Background)
Mario Winans – Programming

Uses in media
In 1996, songs from this album were featured several times in the first season of the UPN sitcom Moesha. "Hump Bounce" featured in the third episode, "Down Low (Nobody Has to Know)" was featured in the tenth episode and "You Remind Me of Something" can be heard and was referenced in the fifth episode.

Charts

Weekly charts

Year-end charts

Certifications

See also
List of number-one albums of 1995 (U.S.)
List of number-one R&B albums of 1995 (U.S.)

References

1995 albums
R. Kelly albums
Albums produced by R. Kelly
Albums produced by Barry Hankerson
Jive Records albums